Alexander Gennadyevich Zhurbin (born 14 January 1992) is a Russian tennis player.

Tennis career 
Zhurbin has a career high ATP singles ranking of 555 achieved on 3 April 2017. He also has a career high ATP doubles ranking of 565 achieved on 13 October 2014. Zhurbin has won 1 ITF Futures singles title and 4 ITF Futures doubles titles.

Zhurbin made his ATP main draw debut at the 2010 St. Petersburg Open.

External links 

1992 births
Living people
Russian male tennis players